Sceloenopla octopunctata, is a species of leaf beetle found in India and Sri Lanka.

Description
Body length is about 4.50 to 5.75 mm. Body slightly elongate and oblong. Head, prothorax and elytra are reddish brown in color. Eyes are oval. Antennae about 1.60 to 2.10 mm long. The first antennal segment is reddish brown, and other segments are dark brown. Prothorax length is about 0.08 to 1.20, mm. Pronotal disc with four longitudinal depressions. Scutellum pentagonal. Elytral length is about 3.20 to 3.90 mm. Elytra oblong with eight rows of punctures at each elytron base. There are six black spots on elytra. Hind wings which are small and brown are about 5.00 mm long. Legs are elongated. Legs and ventrum are yellowish brown.

Indian population is elevated to subspecies level as Sceloenopla octopunctata sexmaculata Weise, 1905. Body length is 4.30 to 5.25 mm. Head, prothorax and elytra are brown in color. Total length of antennae is 2.00 to 2.20 mm. Eyes are circular. Prothorax is 0.90 to 1.00 mm long. Elytral length is 3.50 to 3.75 mm. Hind wings length is 4.50 mm.

References 

Cassidinae
Insects of Sri Lanka
Beetles described in 1858